Los Lobos Goes Disney is a covers album by the Mexican American rock group Los Lobos, on which the band interprets songs from the Disney catalogue, most of which were featured in their animated films. It was released on 27 October 2009 through Disney Sound.

The album blends different musical styles across thirteen songs, such as rock and roll, surf-rock, Americana, country folk, Mexican norteño and Tejano music, Cajun, zydeco, ska, and blues jazz. Los Lobos saxophone player Steve Berlin said, "The kids record doesn't sound like a kids record. It just sounds like Los Lobos playing funky old songs."

Reception

AllMusic reviewer William Ruhlmann gave the album a rating of three-and-a-half stars out of five, and wrote, "Los Lobos Goes Disney could have been called Disney goes Los Lobos instead, since the group applies its familiar mixture of musical styles to Disney songs." He added that the band's interpretations "are hardly definitive, but they are enjoyable".

Doug Collette, writing for Glide Magazine, gave it five out of ten, saying that right from the start of album opener "Heigh Ho", "it’s apparent Los Lobos inhabit the music as much as it inhabits them. An onslaught of percussion gives way to chanting in Spanish, an arrangement that might just as easily adorn one of the band’s originals." Collette also felt that the band were "as tasteful as usual throughout".

John Metzger of The Music Box magazine gave the album three stars out of five, and said that the original songs aren’t necessarily well suited to Los Lobos’ style, "so the success of Los Lobos Goes Disney largely is dependent upon the band’s ability to find a unique perspective for delivering this material ... the results are merely adequate, even if they are passively enjoyable."

The Fowler Tribune's Patrick Varine called it "a really, really entertaining cover album", and said that it "plays just as well for kids as it will for adults".

Track listing

Personnel 
Credits adapted from the album's liner notes.
Los Lobos
 David Hidalgo – vocals, guitar, accordion, hidalguera, requinto jarocho, keyboards 
 Cesar Rosas – vocals, guitar, bajo sexto
 Louie Pérez – vocals, guitar, jarana 
 Conrad Lozano – vocals, bass, guitarron 
 Steve Berlin – saxophone, flute, percussion, keyboards
Additional musicians
 Cougar Estrada – drums, percussion, keyboards
 Vicki Rosas – vocals on "Grim Grinning Ghosts"
Production
 Los Lobos – producer
 Mark Johnson – engineer, mixing
 Greg Morgenstein – engineer, mixing
 Dave McNair – mastering
 Mando Tavares – production assistance
 Louie Pérez – art direction
 Steve Gerdes – art direction
 Anabel Sinn – album design
 Louie Pérez III – drawing

References

Los Lobos albums
2009 albums
Disney Sound albums
Children's music albums
Covers albums